Luís de Sousa (6 October 1630 in Porto – 4 January 1701 in Lisbon) was Archbishop of Lisbon. He was a major figure of the second half of the seventeenth century, serving as Royal Chaplain and Councillor of State of Portugal, later being created a Cardinal by Pope Innocent XII in 1697.

Early life
 Belonging to the illustrious family of Sousa's, one of the oldest in Portugal, descendants of Martim Afonso Chichorro, an illegitimate son of Afonso III, Luís was the fourth and last son of Diogo Lopes de Sousa (c.1595-27.12.1640), 2nd Count of Miranda do Corvo, son Henrique Sousa Tavares and Mécia de Vilhena, and his wife Leonor de Mendonça (c.1600-24.08.1656), the daughter of João Rodrigues de Sá, 1st Count of Penaguião and Isabel de Mendonça. The other siblings were Isabel (1624), Henrique, 1st Marquis of Arronches and Mecia, who married Manuel Baltazar da Câmara, 1st Count of Ribeira Grande.
Luís was born in the city of Porto, on 6 October 1630, since is father was the Governor of the Relação e Casa do Porto, hereditary rank given to his family in 1582 by Philip II of Spain, the new king of Portugal after the Iberian Union. In 1633, Diogo de Sousa was appointed  chairman of the Conselho da Fazenda  by Philip IV and the family moved to Madrid. The young Luís entered in the household of queen Elisabeth as a page until 1646, when his family was allowed to return to Portugal after the revolution of 1640.

Religious studies
In Lisbon, Luís de Sousa was admitted in the household of Prince Teodósio, the heir-apparent son of the new Portuguese king John IV, starting his religious studies in the Jesuits College of Santo Antão. On 8 February 1651 went to Rome, to the Pontifical Gregorian University, where he obtained a doctorate in canon law  after what he spend some years working in the Roman Curia. It was in Rome that, most likely, Luís was ordained Priest, but there is no information about when and where it occurred.

Priesthood and Episcopate
 In 1655 Pope Alexander VII appointed Luís de Sousa has Dean of the Porto Cathedral chapter. When of his return to Portugal, Luís de Sousa spent some months in Venice, Flanders, Netherlands and France, arriving to Porto on 26 September 1656.

In 1658 Luís de Sousa was named governor of the Diocese of Porto and in 1669 the Regent Peter of Braganza appointed him Governor of Porto, in the absence of Luís's brother, Henrique, ambassador in the Netherlands.
In the same year, 1669, the Regent appointed Luís de Sousa as Grande Almoner, Royal Chaplain and Canon of the Lisbon Cathedral chapter.

On 19 January 1671 was appointed Titular bishop of Hippo Diarrhytus by Pope Clement X and was consecrated on 14 June of the same year, in the Royal Chapel, Ribeira Palace, by Álvaro de São Boaventura, bishop of Guarda, assisted by Cristovão da Silveira, archbishop of Goa and Estevão dos Santos, bishop of São Salvador da Bahia. In 1674 was appointed Governor of Santa Casa da Misericórdia, a position he would get a second time, in 1683.
On 17 September 1675 the Regente requested to Pope Clement X the promotion of Luís de Sousa as Metropolitan Archbishop of Lisbon. On 2 December that year, the Pope acceded to the request and granted the pallium to the new Archbishop of Lisbon.

On 30 August 1679 Luís de Sousa was appointed Councilor of State  becoming one of the most influential person in the affairs of state.

His most important legacy while Archbishop of Lisbon was the Bull Lausperene given by Innocent XI in 1682, granting the privilege of the permanent exposition of the Blessed Sacrament in the churches of Lisbon, as was practiced in Rome. This privilege had continuous renovations until 1784, when Pius VI granted a perpetual concession, that is in use until our days.

Cardinal
In the Consistory of 22 July 1697, with an apostolic brief of 31 July 1697, Luís de Sousa was created cardinal priest by Pope Innocent XII, who sent him the red biretta. He never went to Rome to receive the red hat and the title. Despite this nomination Luís de Sousa remained as Royal Chaplain and Archbishop of Lisbon.

The Cardinal Luís de Sousa died in Lisbon, 3 January 1702, and was buried in the Chapel of Our Lady of Piety, in the Lisbon CathedralCloister.

Illegitimate son and descendants
Luís de Sousa had a son, Leonardo de Sousa, whose biographical details are nonexistent. He married Francisca Micaela de Lemos and had a daughter, Clara Antónia de Sousa. She married Manuel de Ramires Esquível, a Fidalgo of the Royal Household, and gave origin to a large number of descendants.

Ancestry

References

Bibliography 
 
 
 

1630 births
1701 deaths
Archbishops of Lisbon
17th-century Portuguese cardinals
People from Porto
18th-century Portuguese cardinals